San Felipe is a town, with a population of 17,360 (2018 census), and a municipality in Retalhuleu Department, situated on the road to Quetzaltenango between El Palmar, Quetzaltenango to the north-west and San Martin Zapotitlan to the south side.

Geography
Geographically, the municipality of San Felipe, Retalhuleu comprises the northern tip of the department of Retalhuleu (borders to the west with department of Quetzaltenango and to the east with the Suchitepéquez Department).  Of the population, many people live in the rural areas, namely Canton Francisco Vela, Canton Tierra Colorada and  Aldea El Palmarcito among others.

Barrios 

 El Centro
 La Linterna
 La Llovizna
 La Piedad 1
 La Piedad 2
 Camilo Alvarado
 El Jardincito
 El Campo
 Colonia El Esfuerzo
 Colonia Fegua
 El Condado San Felipe
 Residenciales La Perla
 Residenciales La Cachita
 Residenciales Bella Julia

References

Municipalities of the Retalhuleu Department